Janne Antero Seurujärvi (born 15 May 1975 in Inari, Finland) is a Finnish Sami politician. He was the first Sami ever to be elected to the Finnish Parliament.
 Seurujärvi represents the Finnish Centre Party (Keskusta).  Seurujärvi was a member of the Finnish Parliament from 2007 to 2011. Seurujärvi is the CEO of Saariselkä ltd., one of the biggest holiday resorts in Finnish Lapland.

References

1975 births
Living people
People from Inari, Finland
Finnish Sámi people
Centre Party (Finland) politicians
Members of the Parliament of Finland (2007–11)